West District may refer to:


China
 West District (Zhongshan), in Guangdong
 West District (Panzhihua), in Sichuan

India
 West Delhi
 West Sikkim district

Taiwan
 West District, Chiayi, in Chiayi City
 West District, Taichung, in Taichung City

See also
Western District (disambiguation)
Nishi-ku (disambiguation)
Seo-gu